Evelyn Cecia Salgado Pineda (born 5 February 1982) is a Mexican politician affiliated with MORENA. Since 15 October 2021, she is Governor of Guerrero. In May 2021, she became the candidate for the governorship of Guerrero for Morena, on 13 June she obtained a majority certificate from the Electoral and Citizen Participation Institute of Guerrero that accredits her as elected governor of the State.

References 

1982 births
Living people
People from Iguala
Party of the Democratic Revolution politicians
Morena (political party) politicians
21st-century Mexican politicians
21st-century Mexican women politicians
Governors of Guerrero
Politicians from Guerrero